James Leonard "Len" McIntyre (28 August 1933 – 25 January 2012), also known by the nickname of "Mac", was an English professional rugby league footballer who played in the 1950s, 1960s and 1970s.

Background
Len McIntyre's birth was registered in Wigan district, Lancashire, England, and he died in Wigan, Greater Manchester, England.

Playing career

International honours
Len McIntyre represented Rugby League XIII while at Oldham in 1961 against New Zealand at White City Stadium, Manchester, and won a cap for Great Britain while at Oldham in the 12-50 defeat by Australia at Station Road, Swinton on Saturday 9 November 1963.

County honours
Len McIntyre represented Lancashire while at Oldham.

Challenge Cup Final appearances
Len McIntyre played  in St. Helens 13-2 victory over Halifax in the 1956 Challenge Cup Final during the 1955–56 season at Wembley Stadium, London on Saturday 28 April 1956, in front of a crowd of 79,341.

County Cup Final appearances
Len McIntyre played  in St. Helens' 3-10 defeat by Oldham in the 1956 Lancashire County Cup Final during the 1956–57 season at Central Park, Wigan on Saturday 20 October 1956.

Division Two Championship
Len McIntyre was at Oldham during the 1963–64 Division Two Championship winning season.

Club career
Len McIntyre made his début for St. Helens on Monday 19 April 1954 away to Huddersfield, playing his last match for St. Helens on Saturday 10 August 1957 home to Barrow, he was transferred from St. Helens to Barrow in 1957 for £750 (based on increases in average earnings, this would be approximately £37,970 in 2013), he made his début for Oldham on Saturday 28 February 1959 away to Whitehaven, he made his début for Wigan on Wednesday 24 August 1966 away to Leigh, playing his last match for Wigan on Monday 15 April 1968 home to Salford, he made his début for Warrington on Tuesday 24 September 1968 home to Huyton, playing his last match for Warrington on Saturday 5 December 1970 away to Leeds, in January 1971 he was swapped by Warrington for Widnes  Brian Larkin (ex-Wigan circa-1963).

References

External links
!Great Britain Statistics at englandrl.co.uk (statistics currently missing due to not having appeared for both Great Britain, and England)
Profile at saints.org.uk
Statistics at orl-heritagetrust.org.uk
Statistics at wigan.rlfans.com
Statistics at rugby.widnes.tv
Rugby League Cup Final - St Helens beats Halifax 13-2 at Wembley
Saints Wembley winner Len McIntyre passes away
Len McIntyre - It is with regret…
(archived by archive.is) With Regret
(archived by archive.is) In Memory Of Len Mcintyre
James Mcintyre : Obituary
Statistics at wolvesplayers.thisiswarrington.co.uk

1933 births
2012 deaths
Barrow Raiders players
English rugby league players
Great Britain national rugby league team players
Liverpool City (rugby league) players
Oldham R.L.F.C. players
Rugby league hookers
Rugby league players from Wigan
Rugby League XIII players
St Helens R.F.C. players
Warrington Wolves players
Widnes Vikings players
Wigan Warriors players